The Anglican Church of St Vincent at Ashington in the civil parish of Chilton Cantelo, Somerset, England, is from the 13th century. It has been designated as a Grade I listed building.

The church was built of local stone with Hamstone dressings and has a clay tile roof. It is a small two-cell church with a nave, supported by offset buttresses and a chancel which underwent Victorian restoration. The western bell turret was added after the construction of the church.

The interior includes Jacobean furnishings. There are box pews and a pulpit with a tester from the 17th century. The baptismal font is octagonal.

The parish is within the benefice of Chilton Cantelo, Ashington, Mudford, Rimpton and Marston Magna within the deanery of Yeovil.

See also

 Grade I listed buildings in South Somerset
 List of Somerset towers
 List of ecclesiastical parishes in the Diocese of Bath and Wells

References

External links

 Article regarding repairs recently carried out on St Vincent's Church, Ashington, on the local community website
 Webpage from the local community website with a section on the history of St Vincent's Church, Ashington

Church of England church buildings in South Somerset
13th-century church buildings in England
Grade I listed churches in Somerset
Grade I listed buildings in South Somerset